Kamandalu (Sanskrit: कमण्डलु) or kamandal or kamandalam is an oblong water pot, originating from the Indian subcontinent, made of a dry gourd (pumpkin) or coconut shell, metal, wood of the Kamandalataru tree, or from clay, usually with a handle and sometimes with a spout. Hindu ascetics or yogis often use it for storing drinking water. The water-filled kamandalu, which is invariably carried by ascetics, is stated to represent a simple and self-contained life.

The kamandalu also used in Hindu iconography, in depiction of deities related with asceticism or water. It is, thus, viewed as a symbol of ascetism in Hinduism. The kamandalu is also used by Jain monks and in depictions of some bodhisattvas.

Method of making
The kamandalu may be made of various materials, including metal, clay, wood and dry gourd. For making the gourd kamandalu, a ripe pumpkin is plucked and the inner plum and seeds are cleaned. This leaves only the outer shell, which is used as the kamandalu. This is interpreted on a spiritual level as the removal of ego from a person. The ripe pumpkin represents the person, seed being the ego. Cleaning the seed thus symbolizes the removal of ego, forming a cleansed person fit to accept self-realization.

In Hinduism

Water in a kamandalu represents Amrita—the elixir of life—thus a symbol of fertility, life and wealth. The kamandalu is often depicted in hands of gods, who appear as ascetics, like Shiva and Brahma and also water deities like Varuna, Ganga (the goddess of the Ganges river) and Sarasvati. Adi Shankaracharya’s ashtotaram hymn praises Shiva whose hand is adorned with the kamandalu. Other deities like the fire-god Agni and the preceptor of the gods, Brihaspati, are depicted carrying the kamandalu. The goddess Karamgamaladharini is described as wearing a garland of kamandalus. The text Devi Mahatmya describes goddess Brahmani slay demons by sprinkling holy water from her kamandalu. A 183–165 BC coin depicts the god Krishna holding a kamandalu.

Several mythological stories refer to the kamandalu. Vamana the dwarf avatar of god Vishnu, requests demon king Mahabali for three feet of land. The donation of the land is sanctified through pouring water through a kamandalu. When Shukra, the demons' preceptor, tried to prevent flow of water from the kamandalu by blocking the spout, Mahabali pierced the spout with a stick, which blinded Shukra. In the Bhagavata Purana, the King Satyavarta after initially put Matsya (Vishnu's avatar as a fish) which he found in the river into his kamandalu, to protect it from the big fish. Later, the fish expanded and protected the king from the great deluge of Hindu mythology. The Mahabharata records the god Dhanvantari brought Amrita in a kamandalu, when he emerged from the churning of the ocean (Samudra manthan). The Hindu epic Ramayana records the monkey-god Hanuman disguised himself as a sage and fooling the demons to drink his urine stored in his kamandalu.

The mythical Sarasvati river traces her creation legends to the creator-god Brahma's kamandalu. The river Ganges is also believed to flow through Brahma's kamandalu. One legend about the Ganges' birth says Brahma washed the big toe of the foot of Vamana and collected the water in his kamandalu, which turns into the river Ganges.

Another river Silambu has a similar tale of origin. When Brahma washed Vamana's foot by the water of his kamandalu, one of the drops fell from Vamana's foot on the earth turning into the river.
Another mythical tale about the pilgrimage place Darsha Pushkarini, narrates how sage Agastya trapped river Kaveri in his kamandalu, when she declined his marriage proposal. This led to famine in the region and, noticing this, Kaveri escaped from kamandalu but with a curse of the sage and was finally purified at Darsha Pushkarini. A variant tells that, angered by Kaveri's confinement, god Ganesha, in the form of a crow, pushed Agastya's kamandalu down, rescuing Kaveri and leading to the river's formation.

In the Sarada legends of Kashmir (based on oral tradition) narrated by Romesh Kumar, it is said that when Ravana was engaged in a war with Rama, goddess Parvati advised Rama to take her to Uttarakhand away from the war scene. Thus, Parvati was carried by Hanuman in the form of water in a kamandalu to be dropped wherever she desired to be dropped. Wherever Hanuman rested on his way to Uttarakhand, drops of water which fell out of the kamandalu on the ground formed the springs Masanag at Gushi and the Devibal spring at Tikr in Kashmir—the kamandalu was kept in a nearby hillock where Parvati rested whereas a Sarada shrine exists. At Amarkantak, the source of river Narmada in Madhya Pradesh, an ancient kamandalu which is always filled with water, is called the Brighu Kamandal.

The text Garuda Purana states donation of a kamandalu in the Shradha (funerary ritual) ceremony ensures that deceased has ample drinking water in his afterlife journey.

In Buddhism and Jainism
Buddhists pour water from the kamandalu onto the palms of people, before rituals, where the water symbolizes elixir of life. It is also called bhumba. Bodhisattvas like Maitreya and Avalokiteshvara are depicted carrying the kamandalu. The kamandalu was initially imported from Brahmanical Hinduism to Buddhism, through god Brahma to Maitreya; it later was incorporated in representations of many Mahayana Buddhist deities.

Jain Digambara sages use the kamandalu for storing water for "toilet purposes".

References

External links 

Containers
Hindu symbols
Objects used in Hindu worship